= Lamatorma =

Ancient Cilicia town

Coordinates: 36°44′06″N 33°00′58″E

Lamatorma was a town of ancient Cilicia, inhabited in Roman times.

Its site is located near Damlaçalı, Asiatic Turkey.
